The trigone (a.k.a. vesical trigone)  is a smooth triangular region of the internal urinary bladder formed by the two ureteric orifices and the internal urethral orifice.

The area is very sensitive to expansion and once stretched to a certain degree, the urinary bladder signals the brain of its need to empty. The signals become stronger as the bladder continues to fill.

Embryologically, the trigone of the bladder is derived from the caudal end of mesonephric ducts, which is of mesodermal origin (the rest of the bladder is endodermal). In the female the mesonephric ducts regress, causing the trigone to be less prominent, but still present.

Pathology
Clinically important because infections (trigonitis) tend to persist in this region.

See also
Trigonitis

References

External links
  - "The Male Pelvis: The Urinary Bladder"

Urinary system